Tamanaku (Tamañkú) is an extinct Cariban language of Venezuela.

The earliest word list of Tamanaku was published by Gilij in 1780, from his 20-year stay among the Tamanku beginning around 1750.

Phonology

Consonants 

Stops may have voiced allophones of [b d ɡ]. Allophones of /p, n, r/ include [β h ɲ l].

Vowels

References

Languages of Venezuela
Cariban languages